Italy competed at the 2014 Winter Olympics in Sochi, Russia, from 7 to 23 February 2014. On 21 February it was announced that bobsledder William Frullani had tested positive for methylhexanamine and was sent home from Sochi.
For the first time since 1980, Italy failed to win a gold medal in an Olympics. Closest was the alpine skier Christof Innerhofer who lost the gold in downhill against Matthias Mayer of Austria with only six hundredths of a second separating the two.

Medalists

|align="left" valign="top"|

| width="22%" align="left" valign="top" |

Alpine skiing 

According to the quota allocation released on 27 January 2014, Italy qualified a total of 19 athletes in alpine skiing.

Men

Women

Biathlon 

Based on their performance at the 2012 and 2013 Biathlon World Championships, Italy qualified 5 men and 5 women.

Men

Women

Mixed

Bobsleigh

Italy rejected quota in the two-woman event. It kept its quota in the 2 and 4 man events.

* – Denotes the driver of each sled

Cross-country skiing 

According to the quota allocation released on 27 January 2014, Italy qualified a total of 16 athletes in cross-country skiing.

Distance
Men

Women

Sprint
Men

Women

Figure skating 

Italy achieved the following quota places:

Team trophy

Freestyle skiing 

Moguls

Slopestyle

Luge

Italy earned the maximum quota of ten spots.

Men

Women

Mixed team relay

Nordic combined

Short track speed skating 

Italy qualified five skaters of each gender for the Olympics during World Cup 3 and 4 in November 2013. Cecilia Maffei was the 5th woman to qualify for the team but she did not skate in any individual distances or in the relay.

Men

Women

Qualification legend: ADV – Advanced due to being impeded by another skater; FA – Qualify to medal round; FB – Qualify to consolation round

Skeleton

Ski jumping 

Italy received the following start quotas:

Snowboarding 

Alpine

Snowboard cross

Qualification legend: FA – Qualify to medal final; FB – Qualify to consolation final

Speed skating 

Italy achieved the following quota places:

Men

Women

References

External links 

Italy Team  at Sochi 2014 Olympics 

Nations at the 2014 Winter Olympics
2014
Winter Olympics